Azepines are unsaturated heterocycles of seven atoms, with a nitrogen replacing a carbon at one position.

See also
 Azepane
 Benzazepines
 Diazepine
 Oxepin
 Borepin

References 
Azepines